Leo Turner (15 May 1928 – 17 December 1997) was an Australian rules footballer who played for Geelong in the Victorian Football League (VFL). He was named in 2001 as a wingman in the club's official 'Team of the Century' with his son Michael named in the same position.

Turner was a left footer and had made his debut with Geelong in 1947. He was a member of their back-to-back premiership sides in 1951 and 1952 and represented Victoria 13 times in interstate football.

References

External links

1928 births
Australian rules footballers from Victoria (Australia)
Geelong Football Club players
Geelong Football Club Premiership players
1997 deaths
Two-time VFL/AFL Premiership players